Inga canonegrensis is a species of plant in the family Fabaceae. It is found only in Costa Rica.

References

canonegrensis
Flora of Costa Rica
Vulnerable plants
Taxonomy articles created by Polbot